The Inflexible-class ships of the line were a class of four 64-gun third rates, designed for the Royal Navy by Sir Thomas Slade. The lines of this class were based heavily on Slade's earlier 74-gun .

Ships

Builder: Barnard, Harwich
Ordered: 26 February 1777
Launched: 7 March 1780
Fate: Broken up, 1820

Builder: Barnard, Deptford
Ordered: 11 February 1778
Launched: 11 April 1781
Fate: Broken up, 1814

Builder: Batson, Limehouse
Ordered: 21 October 1778
Launched: 6 January 1783
Fate: Broken up, 1817

Builder: Randall, Rotherhithe
Ordered: 16 January 1779
Launched: 8 June 1781
Fate: Wrecked, 1799

References
Lavery, Brian (2003) The Ship of the Line – Volume 1: The development of the battlefleet 1650–1850. Conway Maritime Press. .

 
Ship of the line classes
Ship classes of the Royal Navy